Spinogramma is a genus of beetles in the family Cerambycidae, containing the following species:

 Spinogramma ochreovittata Breuning, 1947
 Spinogramma ruficollis Breuning, 1959

References

Agapanthiini